Franja du Plessis (born 2 January 1994) is a South African singer-songwriter. She appeared in the 2013 film As jy sing as Marna. Her debut album, My verhaal ("My Story"), went platinum in 2016. She is the daughter of singer Juanita du Plessis and the sister of singer Ruan Josh.

Education 
She graduated from Hoërskool Die Wilgers in Pretoria.

References

External links 
 

21st-century Namibian women singers
1994 births
Living people

Musicians from Windhoek